Pinhal Grande (Portuguese meaning "large pine forest") is a municipality of the central part of the state of Rio Grande do Sul, Brazil.

Location

The population is 4,329 (2020 est.) in an area of 477.13 km². Its elevation is 394 m. It is located 320 km west of the state capital of Porto Alegre, northeast of Alegrete and east of Santo Ângelo. Pinhal Grande is located in the Planalto Médio, one of the pine species found is the Araucaria angustifolia.

The municipality is partly flooded by the reservoir of the Dona Francisca Hydroelectric Plant on the upper Jacuí River.

Bounding municipalities

Júlio de Castilhos
Nova Palma
Estrela Velha
Ibarama

History

The first inhabitants of the region were indigenous tribes.  The Portuguese dominion explored and later claimed the lands until 1822 when Brazil gained independence.  In 1813, the Curitibano João Gonçalves Padilha along with his brother initiated agricultural commerce between the region and São Paulo.

The area received immigration and integrated the 4ª Colônia de Imigração Italiana (4th Colony of Italian Immigration). As a result, it includes people of Italian, Portuguese and Spanish descent.

The municipality Pinhal Grande was created under Law nº 9600 March 20, 1992.

References

External links
https://web.archive.org/web/20070930200804/http://www.citybrazil.com.br/rs/itacurubi/ 

Municipalities in Rio Grande do Sul